KOMDIV may refer to:

 Comdiv, a deprecated military rank in the Red Army
 KOMDIV-32, a family of 32-bit microprocessors developed by NIISI, Russia
 KOMDIV-64, a 64-bit microprocessor developed by NIISI, Russia